St. Andrews International School, Dusit Campus is an international school for children aged 2 to 11 years old in Dusit, Bangkok, Thailand. Dusit is one of four schools in Thailand under the schools group Cognita, along with St. Andrews International School, Sukhumvit, St. Andrews International School, Rayong, and St. Andrews International School, Sathorn.

Curriculum

Early Years  
Students are instructed under the English National Curriculum, with a strong focus on developing English vocabulary and communication skills. Additionally, students participate in Thai and Mandarin lessons. The school's Early Years Program includes lessons in Maths, Music, Literacy and Physical Education.

Primary 
Students follow the English National Curriculum and are instructed in order to provide continuity into secondary education at St. Andrews International School, Sukhumvit. All students participate in Thai lessons, as well as the option of third language in either French or Mandarin.

Dusit appointed Caroline Ratcliffe as their new head teacher during academic year 2016–2017.

ICT Program 
Dusit provides an Information and Communications Technology program as part of its curriculum. The school utilizes Promethean Smart Boards and tablet devices in each classroom.

Accreditation 
Dusit currently holds silver level accreditation from the Education Development Trust, indicating outstanding performance in key categories, including students' personal development, administrative leadership, and inclusion to all students' academic progression.

Facilities 
Dusit contains two swimming pools, as well as two indoor sports halls. The school has an outdoor sports field, and an ICT suite for educating students on applying technology to their learning.<ref></</ref>

References 

Cognita
Dusit district
Schools in Bangkok
International schools in Bangkok